Legend of the Moles – The Magic Train Adventure is a 2015 Chinese animated family adventure film directed by Li Tingting. It was released on February 5, 2015.

Voice cast
Yang Ou
Xia Lei
Xie Tiantian
Feng Junhua
Cu Cu
Shen Dawei
Fan Junhang

Reception
By February 5, the film had earned  at the Chinese box office.

See also
Legend of the Moles: The Frozen Horror (2011)
Legend of the Moles: The Treasure of Scylla (2012)

References

2010s adventure films
2015 animated films
2015 films
Animated adventure films
Chinese animated films
China Film Group Corporation films